The Vaigai Superfast Express is a Intercity express typed super fast express train running daily between Madurai and Chennai via Tiruchirappalli operated by Southern Railway zone of the Indian Railways. Due to the demand for a day train between Madurai and Madras, which gradually began to increase from the 1970s, the Southern Railway decided to introduce a super fast train for the first time on the MG in Southern railway. Vaigai Express is fondly called the "KING OF CHORD LINE" and both Vaigai Express and Pallavan Express are fondly known as 'CHORD LINE BROTHERS".

History and background 

The train is named after the Vaigai River which flows from the city of Madurai and the train was first started from there.

On 15August 1977 at 6 am, Down Train No. 135 Vaigai Express began its inaugural journey from Madurai Junction to Madras Egmore, with 16 yellow and green livery coaches and a matching YDM4 diesel loco. When it was introduced in 1977, this train had 16 coaches, hauled by twin-YDM4 diesel locos, and by 1984 it was bifurcated as the Pallavan Superfast Express, comprising eight coaches.

For safety purposes, the train was slowed down to a journey time of 7 hours and 40 minutes later on. At that time the train had only three stops they are Villupuram Junction, Tiruchirappalli Junction, and Dindigul Junction. Later on, the stops were increased due to the demands of people.

From 1999 onwards, Vaigai Express has been converted from Meter Gauge to Broad Gauge and hauled by Broad gauge Diesel Locomotives of Golden Rock. From 12February 2014, the Vaigai Express is being hauled by an electric locomotive WAP-4.
  
9 July 2015 onwards this train is regularly hauled by WAP-7 class electric locomotives maintained by Electric Loco Shed, Royapuram. This train got updated with modern LHB coach from 30 June 2019.

Record-breaking run
Vaigai Express made a historic record by covering the distance of 495  km from Madurai to Chennai in 6 hours 40 minutes, on 3 March 2022 12636 MDU-MS Vaigai express departed Madurai with a delay of 21 minutes at 7.26 AM but the train reached its destination 23 minutes before its scheduled time by 2:07 pm, breaking its own best record on the inaugural of 7 hours 5 minutes on 15 August 1977 on metre-gauge section.
The Hindu Madurai edition published this news about the record-breaking run by the Vaigai Express on 5 March 2022.

On 15 October 2022, Vaigai  Express set a new record for covering the distance of 495 km from Madurai to Chennai in 6 hours and 34 minutes.

History of Uniqueness 

It was the only train at that time in SR which had completely tube-lighted interiors and sun-control sliding glass shutters installed for the first time in all its eight-second class coaches.

This is the only MG train on the SR to be fitted with specially enhanced buffers and certified to run at 110 km/h.

For the first time on the MG, the ICF manufactured two 40-seat AC chair car coaches exclusively for the Vaigai and Pallavan express and used in those trains.

It was the first train in Madurai railway division that ran on electric traction after the completion of 92 km long 25-KV overhead railway electrification of Dindigul - Trichy Section on 6 September 2011.

Accident 
Between August 1978 to January 1979  Vaigai Express was involved in accidents twice. On 21 December 1978 it dashed against two boulders between Talanallur and Vriddhachalam Town stations and on 22 December 1978, it derailed at Tiruchirappalli station.

Rakes

See also 
Pandian Superfast Express
Pallavan Superfast Express
Rockfort (Malaikottai) Superfast Express
Pearl City (Muthunagar) Superfast Express
Nellai Superfast Express

References

External links
Vaigai Express
39th Birthday Celebration for Vaigai Exrpress

Transport in Chennai
Transport in Madurai
Named passenger trains of India
Express trains in India
Rail transport in Tamil Nadu
Railway services introduced in 1977